Sportpark Schildman is a municipal park and sports complex in Hendrik Ido Ambacht, Netherlands. It contains the main grounds, training fields, and facilities for:
 ASWH – association football club
 IFC – association football club
 Boulistica – Boules club with field between Hiaten and IFC. This club uses Hiaten's facilities.
 DVS'69 – korfball club
 VV Volido – volleyball and beach volleyball club
 Hiaten – tennis club
 De Luchtsbode – carrier pigeons club
 Sagittarius – shooting sports club

History
In 1969–1970, Schildman was expanded eastwards to also include tennis and hockey facilities. In the mid-1970s it was expanded southward to include more training fields.

Ambachtse Mixed Hockey Club 1965 (AMHC '65) moved to Schildman in 1968 and merged in 1988 into a field hockey club from Zwijndrecht. Sandido marching and show band, since the mid 1970s at Schildman, shut down about 2018. Its former building is now occupied by a church, De Nieuwe Hoop.

References

Sport in Hendrik-Ido-Ambacht
Parks in South Holland
ASWH
Ido's Football Club